Nová Lesná (German: Neu Walddorf) is a village and municipality in Poprad District in the Prešov Region of northern Slovakia.

Geography
The municipality lies at an altitude of 747 metres and covers an area of 4.159 km². It has a population of about 1520 people.

History
In historical records the village was first mentioned in 1315. It belonged to a German language island. The German population was expelled in 1945.

Economy and infrastructure
Tourism dominates the village economy. In Nová Lesná are several pensions and developed tourist infrastructure.

References

External links
http://www.novalesna.sk
https://web.archive.org/web/20160731032411/http://novalesna.e-obce.sk/
Satellite map of Nová Lesná
Nová Lesná at vysoketatry.com

fix indexing